Rhonda is a given name derived from Rhondda, which is a Welsh name. Notable people with the name include:

Rhonda Adams (born 1971), American model and actress
Rhonda Bates (born 1949), American actress
Rhonda Belle Martin (1907–1957), American serial killer
Rhonda Britten (born 1960), the founder of the Fearless Living Institute, speaker and bestselling author
Rhonda Burchmore (born 1960), Australian entertainer
Rhonda Byrne (born 1951), Australian television writer and producer
Rhonda Cator (born 1966), retired badminton player from Australia
Rhonda Cornum, Ph.D., M.D., captured during the Gulf War and molested by her Iraqi captors
Rhonda Corvese, Toronto-based international independent curator
Rhonda Faehn (born 1971), American college gymnastics coach and former college and elite gymnast
Rhonda Fleming (1923–2020), American film and television actress
Rhonda Galbally (born 1948), Australian, currently the Chair of the Royal Women's Hospital Melbourne
Rhonda Ganz, Canadian poet and illustrator
Rhonda Glenn, American sportscaster, award-winning author and a manager of communications for the USGA
Rhonda Jo Petty (born 1955), American pornographic actress
Rhonda Keenum, lobbyist for The WIT Group and former Republican operative who worked for President George W. Bush
Rhonda Kramer, Los Angeles, United States, reporter
Rhonda Paisley (born 1960), artist, author, and former politician from Northern Ireland
Rhonda Pearlman, fictional character on the HBO drama The Wire, played by actress Deirdre Lovejoy
Rhonda Rajsich (born 1978), American racquetball player
Rhonda Roland Shearer, American sculptor, scholar and journalist
Rhonda Rompola, the head women's basketball coach at SMU
Rhonda Ross Kendrick (born 1971), American actress
Rhonda Rucker, folk musician from Louisville, Kentucky
Rhonda Shear (born 1954), American television personality, comedian, and actress
Rhonda Sing (1961–2001), Canadian professional wrestler
Rhonda Sivarajah, Minnesota Republican politician
Rhonda Thorne (born 1958), former World No. 1 squash player from Australia
Rhonda Vincent (born 1962), bluegrass singer, songwriter, mandolin player, guitarist and fiddle player
Rhonda Volmer, fictional character in the HBO series Big Love
Rhonda Watkins (born 1987), Trinidad and Tobago long jumper
Rhonda Wellington Lloyd, fictional character in the television series Hey Arnold!
Rhonda M. Williams (1957–2000), American economist and activist
Rhonda Ritter, a character in the film Grease 2

See also
Ronda § People with the given name Ronda
Rhondda § People with the given name Rhondda
 Help Me, Rhonda, single by The Beach Boys
Rhonda (trick 'r treat)

Feminine given names
English feminine given names
Welsh feminine given names